The 2011 Meyers Norris Penny Charity Classic was held from October 14 to 17 at the Medicine Hat Curling Club in Medicine Hat, Alberta as part of the 2011–12 World Curling Tour. The purse for the men's event was CAD$37,000, while the purse for the women's event was CAD$30,000. The events were both held in a triple knockout format.

Men

Teams

Results

A Event

B Event

C Event

Playoffs

Women

Teams

Results

A-Event

B-Event

C-Event

Playoffs

External links

 
2011 in Canadian curling
October 2011 sports events in Canada
Sport in Medicine Hat
Curling in Alberta